Hanging Grove Township is one of thirteen townships in Jasper County, Indiana, United States. As of the 2010 census, its population was 230 and it contained 106 housing units.

Geography

Unincorporated towns
 Hanging Grove
 McCoysburg

Adjacent townships
 Gillam Township (north)
 Salem Township, Pulaski County (east)
 Monon Township, White County (southeast)
 Milroy Township (southwest)
 Marion Township (west)
 Barkley Township (northwest)

Cemeteries
The township contains two cemeteries: Lefler and Osborne.

Major highways
  Indiana State Road 114

Education
Hanging Grove Township residents may request a free library card from the Jasper County Public Library.

References
 
 United States Census Bureau cartographic boundary files

External links
 Indiana Township Association
 United Township Association of Indiana

Townships in Jasper County, Indiana
Townships in Indiana